Flat Creek is a  long 2nd order tributary to the Swannanoa River in Buncombe County, North Carolina.  It is impounded at Montreat Reservoir and Lake Susan.

Course
Flat Creek rises about 0.5 miles south of Graybeard Mountain in Buncombe County on the Catawba River divide.  Flat Creek then flows southwest through Montreat to meet the Swannanoa River at Black Mountain, North Carolina.

Watershed
Flat Creek drains  of area, receives about 52.4 in/year of precipitation, has a topographic wetness index of 261.49 and is about 79% forested.

References

Rivers of North Carolina
Bodies of water of Buncombe County, North Carolina